is a 26-episode 1960 Japanese television series (told in two thirteen episode chapters) produced by Nisan Productions. It aired on the Fuji Television network every Sunday from April 3 to September 25. The series was about a giant dinosaurian robot created by the Z-Gang to conquer Japan. The show is notable in that it was the first Japanese television series about a kaiju.

Overview

The series was broken into 2 episode arcs that ran 13 half hour episodes each and aired every Sunday morning from 9:30 AM to 10:00 AM.  The first arc was titled Monster Marine Kong (かいじゅうマリンコング) while the second arc was titled Marine Kong Strikes Back (「マリンコングの大逆襲」).
When Dr. Yada a renowned scientist, does research, he realizes the creature is giving off radio waves thus discovering that it is not an organic monster but a robot. The robot was built and is being controlled by the villainous Z-Gang, a cartel of criminals out to conquer Japan. Eventually the Z-Gang's plans are thwarted by a jamming radio wave invented by Dr. Yada and the creature is blown up. In the second arc, the Z-Gang builds a new more powerful version of Marine Kong, but Dr. Yada is able to take over the control waves of the robot and reconfigure it. He then reprograms the robot to follow the instructions of his son, Kazuo. Marine Kong is then sent against the Z-Gang to thwart their plans of Global domination.

Production

In 1959 Nisan Productions planned on producing a series called "Great Seabeast Gebora"(大海獣ゲボラ). The series would feature a gigantic starfish monster as the main character. This series was planned for the TBS network. An outline for this series was published in the September 1959 issue of Boy Pictorial Magazine. Shin-Toho were hired to produce the special effects and six episodes were scripted before it was ultimately canceled.
The following year in 1960, Nisan decided on producing another show featuring a marine-based kaiju this time for Fuji TV, which would become Marine Kong.

This new series took influence from kaiju films, King Kong, Moonlight Mask and Tetsujin 28-go. King Kong was the inspiration for the name. When Gebora the "Marine Mammal" became the kaiju "Marine Kong", publicity materials stated "King Kong comes from the setting of a jungle, Marine Kong comes from the setting of the sea". The Kaiju influence and the monster being Dinosaurian in appearance came from the Kaiju films from Toho. In 1954 Toho studios produced the first Kaiju movie in Japan called Godzilla. In 1955, they produced a sequel, while in 1956 and 1958 they produced both Rodan and Varan respectively. These early Kaiju films were very popular and convinced Nisan Productions that the idea of a Kaiju starring in a serialized television series could be successful. While this was not the first time a Kaiju appeared on Japanese television (in 1958 a huge ape called Mammoth Kong appeared in the popular superhero show Moonlight Mask), it was the first series to star a Kaiju as the main character. This show set the foundation for many latter Kaiju-themed shows that populated Japanese airwaves in the latter 1960's such as Ambassador Magma and Ultraman, as it combined the "Kaiju" genre with the medium of episodic television.
The second arc of the series drew direct inspiration from Tetsujin 28-go and Moonlight Mask.

Tetsujin 28-go debuted as a manga in 1956 and was immediately popular with young boys. That series featured a boy who could control a gigantic robot and this was reflected in the series as Kazuo could control the reprogrammed robot monster Marine Kong and used it to battle the Z-Gang. Also Moonlight Mask was an influence. That series, which debuted in 1958, featured a masked hero that thwarted evil. Some of the latter episodes of Marine Kong featured a female scientist named Takamiya Hisako who could transform into the "Red Angel' a masked super heroine in the same vain as Moonlight Mask. Red Angel was the first transformation based super heroine on Japanese TV.

Initially the budget was very small (¥20,000), and the costume for the monster was very cheaply built with soft rubber. The suit was actually built by the Pook Puppet Theater Company (人形劇団プーク), a popular puppet company that debuted in 1929. Despite being cheap, the costume featured illuminated eyes (something that Tsuburaya Productions would utilize a lot when it came to their Ultra monsters a few years later). During some destruction scenes the monster is seen walking superimposed over shots of buildings being destroyed to save money on costly special effects shots. When Fuji TV broadcast the show the ratings were very strong featuring a 27% audience share. The broadcast was then expanded nationwide to 26 stations. Because of this success, Nisan was able to increase the budget for the series' second arc which included building a more detailed costume with a wire operated mouth for the actor to manipulate himself, the construction of life-sized hands and feet and more detailed miniature work. The first Marine Kong suit scared children with its immensely oversized eyes. When the second suit was built it was given a slightly different face to appear less frightening. The series was directed by Toshio Shimura and Toshiro Lizuka.

The series was quite popular and various manga comics featuring the character was released such as "Monster Marine Kong" from Shōnen Gahōsha " where it was serialized from June to September 1960. As well various toys and merchandise were released.

Episodes

Part 1  Monster Marine Kong 
 	
Episode 1 	April 3	The Mystery of the Monster 
Episode 2 	April 10 Danger! Kazuo  
Episode 3 	April 17 The Boatman
Episode 4 	April 24 The Secret of the X Radio Waves
Episode 5 	May 1	Tracking the Signal 
Episode 6 	May 8	Friend or Foe?
Episode 7 	May 15	Debunking the Monster
Episode 8 	May 22	Discovery of the Enemy Base 
Episode 9 	May 29 	Using Strategy Against the Enemy
Episode 10 	June 5	You Will Not Escape! 
Episode 11 	June 12 The Approaching Crisis 
Episode 12 	June 19	Homebase Infiltration 
Episode 13 	June 26 The Great Explosion

Part 2 Marine Kong Strikes Back

Episode 14	July 3	Take Control of the Monster
Episode 15	July 10	The crisis! Kazuo 
Episode 16	July 17	The Secret Laboratory of Crisis
Episode 17	July 24	Red Angel! Ally of Justice
Episode 18	July 31	Duel on the Plateau
Episode 19	August 7 Save Kazuo!
Episode 20	August14  The Threatening Phone Call
Episode 21	August 21 In the Looming Clutches
Episode 22	August 28  In Desperate Pursuit
Episode 23	September 4 Stratagem
Episode 24	September11 Time Bomb
Episode 25	September18 The Approaching Battle!
Episode 26	September 25 The Z-Gang

Cast

Dr. Yada: Hayashi Hiroshi
Radio waves Institute director, the authority of physics.
Kazuo Yada: Ota Hiroyuki
Son of Dr. Yada. Controls Marine Kong in second arc.
Maru: Mihara Yuko
Photographer following the Marine Kong incident
Iwata reporter : Koji Oda
Newspaper reporter who follows the Marine Kong incident.
Yada Hitomi : Kikuchi Yoko
Leader of the Z-Gang
Takamiya Hisako / Red Angel : Hisako Tsukuba
Female scientist whio is also the masked heroine Red Angel who battles against the Z-Gang.
Marine Kong: Takagi Shinpei
Giant robot monster built by the Z-Gang for global domination that runs on radio waves. Two different ones were built described as Unit 1 and Unit 2.

Home Video
In 1984, Global Video released a handful of episodes on VHS tape in Japan.

References

1960 Japanese television series debuts
Kaiju
Tokusatsu
Fuji TV original programming